The Advisory Parliament existed from 15 October 1981 to 6 December 1983 . It was established by the military rule of 1980 Turkish coup d'état. 120 MPs were representatives of the provinces and 40 MPs were appointed by the military rule.

Main parliamentary milestones 
Some of the important events in the history of the parliament are the following:

Background: Between the 16th term and the Advisory Parliament
13 September 1980- Following the coup, Kenan Evren became the head of the state (president). Military rule (MGK) replaced the parliament
21 September – Bülent Ulusu formed the 44th government of Turkey
27 October 1980 -Provisional constitution 
30 June 1981 – Military rule (MGK) which exercised legislation passed law about the advisory parliament
15 October 1981 – The names of the Advisory parliament MPs were announced
16 October 1981 – All former political parties were closed by the military rule

During the Advisory Parliament
23 October 1981 – Sadi Irmak, a former prime minister was elected as the speaker of the parliament in the first session of the parliament 
7 November 1982 – Referendum on the new constitution (accepted) 
8 November 1982 –According to new constitution Kenan Evren became the 7th president of Turkey 
 8 April 1983 – New election law
15 May 1983 – Nationalist Democracy Party (MDP) was founded by Turgut Sunalp
21 May 1983 – Three new parties ; Motherland Party (ANAP by Turgut Özal, Great Turkey Party by Fethi Esener and Populist Party by Necdet Calp were founded 
26 May 1983 - Social democracy Party (SODEP) was founded by Erdal İnönü
 6 November 1983 - General election

References

1981 establishments in Turkey
1983 disestablishments in Turkey
Advisory parliament of Turkey
Terms of the Grand National Assembly of Turkey
Political history of Turkey
Constituent assemblies